The 2015 Campeonato Internacional de Tenis de Santos was a professional tennis tournament played on clay courts. It was the fifth edition of the tournament which was part of the 2015 ATP Challenger Tour. It took place in Santos, Brazil between 20 and 26 April 2015.

Singles main-draw entrants

Seeds

 1 Rankings are as of April 13, 2015.

Other entrants
The following players received wildcards into the singles main draw:
  Rogério Dutra Silva 
  Thiago Monteiro 
  Orlando Luz 
  Marcelo Zormann

The following players received entry from the qualifying draw:
  Ricardo Hocevar 
  José Pereira  
  Pedro Sakamoto
  Agustín Velotti

The following players received an entry as a lucky loser:
  Federico Coria

Champions

Singles

 Blaž Rola def.  Germain Gigounon, 6–3, 3–6, 6–3

Doubles

 Máximo González /  Roberto Maytín def.  Andrés Molteni /  Guido Pella, 6–4, 7–6(7–4)

External links
Official Website

Campeonato Internacional de Tenis de Santos
Campeonato Internacional de Tenis de Santos